Blain is a surname. Notable people with the surname include:

 Brian Blain, Australian actor
 James Blain, Canadian Boy Scout
 John Blain (disambiguation), multiple people
 John Blain (Canadian football), Canadian football player
 Philippe Blain, French volleyball player and coach
 Tony Blain, New Zealand cricketer
 Gérard Blain, French actor
 Willy Blain, French boxer
 Adair Blain, Austrian Parliament member
 Ser'Darius Blain, American actor
 Georgia Blain, Australian journalist
 Blain, fictional character in the 1987 film Predator

See also
Blaine (surname)
Blane, a surname